Clarence Price Newton (July 31, 1879 – December 4, 1958) was an American politician. He was a member of the Arkansas House of Representatives, serving from 1919 to 1925. He was a member of the Democratic party.

References

1958 deaths
1879 births
People from Lonoke County, Arkansas
Speakers of the Arkansas House of Representatives
Democratic Party members of the Arkansas House of Representatives